The Last Fine Time is a 1991 book by American author Verlyn Klinkenborg about a blue collar Polish-American bar in Buffalo, New York, inherited by his father-in-law in 1947. The story of George & Eddie's, which became a popular nightspot, is the story not only of a family business during a rapidly changing historical period, but of the city of Buffalo in its multi-ethnic heyday. Portions of the book appeared originally in The New Yorker.

References

External links
Summary at Google Books
Book review at Entertainment Weekly{Dead link}

1991 non-fiction books
History of Buffalo, New York
Polish-American history
Alfred A. Knopf books
American non-fiction books